Marko Savić (born 11 January 1981 in Belgrade) is a German water polo player who competed in the 2008 Summer Olympics.

References

1981 births
Living people
German male water polo players
Olympic water polo players of Germany
Water polo players at the 2008 Summer Olympics
German people of Serbian descent